Vernon D. Crawford (February 13, 1919 - September 27, 1994) was a professor, dean, and later interim president at the Georgia Institute of Technology from March 1969 to August 1969, and later chancellor of the Georgia Board of Regents from 1979 to 1985.

Early life and education
A native of Amherst, Nova Scotia, Crawford earned his Bachelor of Science degree in physics from Mount Allison University in Sackville, New Brunswick.  He then earned his Master of Science degree from Dalhousie University in Halifax, Nova Scotia.  Finally, he earned his Ph.D. in physics at the University of Virginia, in Charlottesville, Virginia.

Career

Awards and memberships
According to Arthur G. Hansen, Crawford was a member of the honorary societies of Sigma Xi, Sigma Pi Sigma, and Phi Kappa Phi, as well as the American Physical Society.

Partly due to their status as benefactors of Georgia Tech, the pool at the Georgia Tech Campus Recreation Center is named in honor of Vernon and his wife Helen.

References

1919 births
1994 deaths
Presidents of Georgia Tech
Chancellors of the Georgia Board of Regents
People from Amherst, Nova Scotia
20th-century American academics